Okatovo is a rural locality (a village) in Krasnooktyabrskoye Rural Settlement, Gus-Khrustalny District, Vladimir Oblast, Russia. The population was 127 as of 2010.

Geography 
Okatovo is located on the Shershul River, 48 km southeast of Gus-Khrustalny (the district's administrative centre) by road. Stepanovo is the nearest rural locality.

References 

Rural localities in Gus-Khrustalny District
Melenkovsky Uyezd